A half-frame camera is a film camera using a film format of half the usual exposure format of a full frame 35mm film camera. this is commonly expressed, more technically, as 18×24 mm using 18×24 mm of a regular 135 film. It is closer to the normal frame size of a 35 mm motion film. This leaves half frame cameras to derive their film plate size from the aspect ratio, and frame size that was first designated by Thomas Edison (24.89 by 18.67 millimetres or 0.980 by 0.735 inches) at the dawn of the motion picture industry.

Traditionally, the additional film width on motion picture film is used for audio, in later film standards, although the original patent for sound on film is derived from the 1880s.  However, for still cameras using the 35 mm film, the usual format is 24×36 mm. When half frame cameras are used however, they take an 18×24 mm exposure and therefore are  called "half-frame" as they expose half of the film plate size of 35mm stills cameras despite its similarity in width to 35 mm film when used in motion picture cameras.
Half frame came into vogue, as a shooting experience, as a cheaper option to full frame cameras in the 1960s, this trend developed mostly out of Japan. The half frame trend began its origins with cameras such as the Olympus Pen models. Half frame cameras allowed for more compact cameras, to exist alongside full frame cameras, particularly in rangefinder styled cameras, due to the lack of a traditional mirror, using a much smaller, "rangefinder" styled mirror, along with the smaller frame size and therefore smaller lenses required. The smaller lenses could cover the smaller imaging circle. This resulted in far smaller cameras such as the Olympus Pen cameras.

Meanwhile, in the 1960s, along with a growing list of smaller full frame cameras, such as Kodak, with the Kodak Instamatic in 1963, the concerns about the economic benefits of half frame photos began to appear. While allowing 72 shots on a standard 36 shot roll seemed economically beneficial, when taken into account of the reduced image quality, the benefits did not provide the average photographer with a better shooting experience they may have been looking for. This would also became true for many other formats including 110 film and APS film that attempted to and failed to augment 35 mm film. However unlike APS, as a separate format, half frame survives as it can be shot on standard 35 mm film. On half frame cameras this can still be achieved today by using modern film produced by companies such as Fuji and Kodak in the 35 mm format.

However, due to the fact that half frame cameras use standard 35 mm film stocks, "half frame" continues to exist as a niche photographic format to the present date for diptych photography. The irregular frame markers and its novelty of exposing two frames on one slide or negative has led to the growth of half frame cameras as a diptych format. The diptych format allows photographers to convey meaning through multiple images in on frame. Yet, these benefits are confounded, with the nature of the exposures of a half frame camera that have a vertical (portrait) orientation as opposed to the horizontal (landscape) orientation of a 35 mm SLR or rangefinder.

The exceptions are cameras that were sold at the time that chose to use vertically run film mechanisms (examples including the Konica Recorder and Belomo Agat 18). The necessity to hold a half frame camera in portrait orientation to take a landscape photo did not always align with consumers choices for numerous reasons, but predominately ergonomic factors. The half frame camera can be seen as defying traditional camera ergonomics often due to the nature of having to hold the camera vertically to take a horizontal shot leading to rejection of the format through confusion. Although more recently through social media, the portrait aspect has been seen as beneficial, particularly with Instagram changing from the 1:1 aspect ratio to 4:5 and 9:16 to fit more image on a phone/tablet device. The 3:4 aspect ratio of half frame photos can easily be cropped to 4:5 in portrait orientation without a significant reduction in image quality producing an "Instagram ready" photo shooting experience among younger photographers using half frame cameras. This has been reinforced by Kodak's reintroduction of half frame cameras through the Kodak Ektar branded H35 half frame camera.

Technologically, the most advanced electronic half-frame camera, that is designed as such from its design inception, is the Yashica Samurai single lens reflex. Although, the earlier Olympus PEN and Konica Auto Reflex reached a pinnacle for mechanical half frame cameras, from the 1960s onwards, by offering fully functional rangefinder styled options such as the Olympus Pen and SLR options respectively they remain popular among film shooters today.

The Konica Auto Reflex can also switch between full and half frame while shooting and at the same time. The Auto Reflex SLR gives access to the full Konica AR lens library in half frame, and additionally Nikon F, M42, and Leica M mount with adapters under the provision of stop down metering. Konica at the time created a camera with some deliberation, that due to its lens flange register, and therefore mount distance, could be used by photographers from other brand manufacturers with simple lens mount adapters. The diversity in technology showed that multiple manufacturers would try to define their specific visions for the half frame format at the peak of half frame cameras.

In other usage cases, for half frame cameras, for some specific needs, there were cameras originally designated for use as full-frame cameras that were produced or custom modified in very small production runs as half-frame models, for example some Leica (1950 made in Canada Leica 72), Nikon (1960–61 Nikon S3M 18x24mm rangefinder, Nikon FM2 SLR), Konica (FT-1 Pro Half)  or Robot (Robot 24x24mm camera) rangefinders,  and some Alpa (Alpa 18x24 SLR) and Minolta SLRs. These limited production run cameras are mainly of interest as collectibles rather than daily use cameras. Due to scarcity value these cameras attract more value as a stock commodity than as a commonly used camera. In other cases, the smaller size of the cameras at the time, coupled with the increase in image quality saw half frame as a viable replacement option for the 110 film format.

External links 
 A list of half-frame cameras, by Massimo Bertacchi

References 

Film formats